Shidrak Yousif (born 1 July 1942) is a former Iraqi football midfielder who played for Iraq in the 1972 AFC Asian Cup. He played for the national team between 1965 and 1973.

He won the 1964 and 1966 Arab Cup. Yousif retired after the 1974 World Cup qualifiers.

References

Iraqi footballers
Iraq international footballers
1972 AFC Asian Cup players
Association football midfielders
1942 births
Living people